Vidar Nisja (born 21 August 1986) was a Norwegian midfielder who retired 18 December 2018.

Career statistics

Personal
Nisja has actively participated in KRIK work and has studied at Stavanger Mission College.

References

External links

1986 births
Living people
People from Hå
Norwegian footballers
Norway youth international footballers
Norway under-21 international footballers
Bryne FK players
Viking FK players
Sandnes Ulf players
Norwegian First Division players
Eliteserien players
Association football midfielders
Sportspeople from Rogaland